Haimbachia leucopleuralis is a moth in the family Crambidae. It was described by Paul Mabille in 1900. It is found on the Comoros and in Madagascar.

References

Haimbachiini
Moths described in 1900